The 2019 Women's Pan-American Volleyball Cup was the 18th edition of the annual women's volleyball tournament. It was held in Trujillo and Chiclayo, Peru from 6 to 14 July. Eleven teams will compete in the tournament.

United States won the title for the third straight time (7th overall) after defeating the Dominican Republic in the final by 3–0.

Pools composition

Venues
Coliseo Gran Chimu, Trujillo (Group A, quarterfinals, semifinals, 5th place, 3rd place and final matches)
Coliseo Cerrado de Chiclayo, Chiclayo (Group B, classification 7th–10th, 9th place and 7th place matches)

Pool standing procedure
 Number of matches won
 Match points
 Points ratio
 Sets ratio
 Result of the last match between the tied teams

Match won 3–0: 5 match points for the winner, 0 match points for the loser
Match won 3–1: 4 match points for the winner, 1 match point for the loser
Match won 3–2: 3 match points for the winner, 2 match points for the loser

Preliminary round
All times are Peru Time (UTC−05:00).

Group A

Group B

Final round

Championship bracket

7th–10th places bracket

Classification 7th–10th

Quarterfinals

9th place match

7th place match

5th place match

Semifinals

3rd place match

Final

Final standing

Individual awards

Most Valuable Player
  Micha Hancock
Best Setter
  Micha Hancock
Best Outside Hitters
  Kadie Rolfzen
  Brayelin Martínez
Best Middle Blockers
  Hannah Tapp
  Valerín Carabalí
Best Opposite
  Paulina Prieto
Best Scorer
  Paulina Prieto
Best Server
  Wilmarie Rivera
Best Libero
  Justine Wong-Orantes
Best Digger
  Camila Gómez
Best Receiver
  Justine Wong-Orantes

References

Women's Pan-American Volleyball Cup
Pan-American Volleyball Cup
International volleyball competitions hosted by Peru
2019 in Peruvian women's sport
Sports in Trujillo, Peru
Pan-American Volleyball Cup